Geoffrey Winston Pryce (17 July 1961 – 5 December 2020) was an English rugby league footballer, most associated with York.  Originally a winger, he occasionally played centre, and later in his career he moved into the second row.  He was also known to play as an emergency hooker.

Background
Geoff Pryce was born on 17 July 1961 in Bradford, West Riding of Yorkshire, England. He died on 5 December 2020 aged 59.

Career

He made his debut for York on 28 December 1980 against Swinton and was a member of the side that gained promotion 1981 and 1986 and the side that reached the semi final of the 1984 Rugby League Challenge Cup. He made a total of 286 appearances for York between 1980 and 1983, scoring 101 tries and 374 points.
He scored a hat trick on his Yorkshire debut on 26 May 1982 in a 22–21 win over Lancashire at Leigh.
He is an inductee into the York Hall Of Fame.

Family

He was a member of a well known Bradford rugby league playing family, including Leon Pryce, Dennis Pryce, Karl Pryce and Waine Pryce.

Style of play

He was described as "Best known for his tremendous strength, he was a strong runner, often taking several tacklers to stop him. He played on the wing, in the pack and everywhere in between throughout his time at York. His style of play – along with his approachable nature and huge smile – made him a fans’ favourite."

References

1961 births
2020 deaths
Black British sportspeople
English rugby league players
Geoff
Rugby league players from Bradford
Rugby league wingers
York Wasps players